Mata Redonda is a district of the San José canton, in the San José province of Costa Rica.

Geography 
Mata Redonda has an area of 3.69 km2 and an elevation of 1125 metres.

It borders with two San José cantons, Escazú and Alajuelita, and with Pavas, Uruca, Merced, Hospital and Hatillo as well.

Locations
Mata Redonda district includes the "barrios" (or neighbourhoods) of Americas, Anonos, Balcón Verde, Calle Morenos, El Rey, Holanda, La Salle, Loma Linda, Niza, Nunciatura, Rancho Luna, Roma, Urbanización Paseo Colón, and Sabana.

Demographics 

For the 2011 census, Mata Redonda had a population of 8313 inhabitants.

Besides the case of Carmen, afflicted by a strong population decline, Mata Redonda district possess the lowest rate of population density in San José downtown, because within its confines lies the biggest urban park in the city, La Sabana Metropolitan Park.

Transportation

Road transportation 
The district is covered by the following road routes:
 National Route 1
 National Route 27
 National Route 39
 National Route 104
 National Route 167
 National Route 176
 National Route 177

Rail transportation 
The Interurbano Line operated by Incofer goes through this district.

External links
Municipalidad de San José. Distrito Mata Redonda – Website of San Jose Mayor, includes a map of the district and related info.

References 

Districts of San José Province
Populated places in San José Province